Mitch Pileggi  (born April 5, 1952) is an American actor.  He played Horace Pinker in Shocker, Walter Skinner on The X-Files, Colonel Steven Caldwell on Stargate Atlantis, Ernest Darby in Sons of Anarchy, and Harris Ryland in the TNT revival of Dallas (2012–2014).

Early life and education
Pileggi was born in Portland, Oregon, the son of Maxine, a homemaker, and Vito Pileggi, a defense contractor. Pileggi's family moved frequently because of his father's occupation, and Pileggi lived in Oregon, California, and Texas before spending most of his adolescence in Turkey.

Career
Pileggi began acting while he was a high school student in Turkey, playing musical theater. After returning to Austin from Iran, he performed in local theaters and continued his acting career with small roles in B-movies and guest roles in television series, such as Dallas, China Beach, Code of Vengeance, and Walker, Texas Ranger.

In the 1980s, Pileggi starred in several films, including Three O'Clock High, as Duke "The Duker" Herman, an overzealous tough-as-nails high school parking lot security guard. In 1988, he starred in "Brothers In Arms" as one of the villains (Caleb) and in Shocker as body-possessing serial killer Horace Pinker. The latter was directed by horror icon Wes Craven. Pileggi played the villain in the 1991 television film, Knight Rider 2000, a sequel to the original television series Knight Rider. He also appeared briefly in the 1992 film Basic Instinct as an investigating police officer in the interrogation scene of Michael Douglas. He also appeared in the 1995 vampire film Vampire in Brooklyn (also directed by Craven) starring Eddie Murphy as an Italian mobster.

His most notable role was as the FBI's Assistant Director Walter Skinner on The X-Files. The role was originally recurring, but the part expanded, and in 2001 he became a regular member of the cast. The character gradually became the most integral character besides the two leads.  He remained with the series until its end in 2002. Pileggi played the character in the 1998 The X-Files film and in the 2008 film The X-Files: I Want to Believe. He also reprised the role in the 2016 miniseries.

Pileggi's later work has included starring in the short-lived series Tarzan and co-starring with Barbara Hershey and Oliver Hudson in the short-lived series The Mountain. He played the recurring role of character Colonel Steven Caldwell, Commander of the Earth Battlecruiser, Daedalus, in the second (2005) and subsequent seasons of the television series Stargate Atlantis. He also appeared in an episode of CSI: Crime Scene Investigation and in 2006 had a regular guest role on Day Break as Robbery/Homicide Detective Spivak. Pileggi also appeared on the Cold Case episode "Offender", as a father accused of molesting and murdering his own son, who then threatens to murder one child sex offender per day until the case is reopened and solved. Pileggi also played the role of Larry Jennings, chairman of the board of the hospital, in Grey's Anatomy. In a first season episode of That '70s Show he played Red Forman's swinger, navy buddy, Bull, alongside his real life wife, Arlene.

Pileggi appeared in two episodes of Law and Order: Special Victims Unit as DEA agent Jack Hammond. Since 2008, Pileggi has played Ernest Darby, the head of a white supremacist gang called the "Nordics", in the FX drama Sons of Anarchy . He also played spree killer Norman Hill (AKA The Road Warrior) on a season four episode of Criminal Minds, titled "Normal". Pileggi has also done some voice acting. His voice was featured as the githzerai Dak'kon in the video game Planescape: Torment. He voices Commissioner James Gordon on the Kids' WB series The Batman. Pileggi also hosted the controversial FOX specials Breaking the Magician's Code: Magic's Biggest Secrets Finally Revealed and Conspiracy Theory: Did We Land on the Moon?. He also played the recurring role of Sam and Dean Winchester's maternal grandfather, Samuel Campbell, in the TV series Supernatural.

Pileggi starred in the TNT drama series Dallas as Harris Ryland. He was promoted to series regular as of second season.

As of 2014, Pileggi is on the advisory board of Sci-Fest, the first annual Los Angeles Science Fiction One-Act Play Festival, held in May 2014.

Since 2021, Pileggi has played Bonham Walker, the father of the titular Cordell Walker, in The CW crime drama series Walker reboot.

Filmography

Films

Television

Video games

Awards and nominations

References

External links

 

American male film actors
American male television actors
American male voice actors
Living people
Male actors from Portland, Oregon
University of Texas at Austin alumni
Place of birth missing (living people)
20th-century American male actors
21st-century American male actors
American male soap opera actors
American people of Italian descent
People of Calabrian descent
1952 births
Audiobook narrators